The Steel Tsar is a sci-fi/alternate history novel by Michael Moorcock, first published in 1981 by Granada. Being a sequel to Warlord of the Air (1971) and The Land Leviathan (1974), it is the final part of Moorcock's A Nomad of the Time Streams trilogy regarding the adventures of Captain Oswald Bastable and which has been seen as an early example of steampunk fiction. The same cover image was used for the 1984 reissue of Judas Priest album Rocka Rolla and also the 1989 video game Ballistix.

Plot summary 
In a story introduced by the ubiquitous Una Persson (who is also found in other works by Moorcock), the trilogy's hero, Captain Oswald Bastable, finds himself in an alternative twentieth century in which the Confederate States of America won the American Civil War and neither the First World War nor the October Revolution ever occurred. Over the course of the story Oswald witnesses the destruction of Singapore at the hands of the Imperial Japanese Aerial Navy, is imprisoned on Rishiri Island, joins the Russian Imperial Airship Navy and is sent to put down the rebellious Cossacks who follow the theocratic demagogue known as the 'Steel Tsar': Iosif Djugashvili. He also experiences a repeat of events from the first novel as he is assigned to drop an atomic bomb on the anarchist Nestor Makhno and his Black Flag Army, but ultimately this does not happen; the bomb is turned against the Steel Tsar's own forces and Makhno survives.

References

External links

 

1981 British novels
1981 science fiction novels
British alternative history novels
British science fiction novels
British steampunk novels
Novels about imperialism
Novels by Michael Moorcock
Cultural depictions of Nestor Makhno